Hage (East Frisian: Haag) is a small East Frisian town in Lower Saxony, Germany. Located in the Aurich District close to the North Sea, approx. 5 km east of Norden, Hage has a population of 5,893 as of 31 December 2002. Hage is also the seat of the Samtgemeinde ("collective municipality") Hage.

It is believed people from the area emigrated to Sundsvall in Sweden centuries ago and kept Hage as their surname.
Descendants of that group eventually emigrated to Australia around 1900, to South Stradbroke Island near the Gold Coast in the state of Queensland. To this day the descendants from that group maintain a strong presence in southeast Queensland.

Notable people
 

Rudolf Ströbinger (1931–2005), journalist and writer

References

Towns and villages in East Frisia
Aurich (district)